was an admiral in the Imperial Japanese Navy during World War II.

Biography
Hasegawa was born in Saitama prefecture. He graduated from the 42nd class of the Imperial Japanese Navy Academy in 1914, ranked 27th out of 117 cadets. After his promotion to ensign, he was assigned to the cruiser .

After attending torpedo school and naval artillery school, he was promoted to sub-lieutenant and served on the battleship , cruiser  and destroyer . Hasegawa was promoted to lieutenant in 1920, and attended advanced studies in torpedo warfare from 1920–1921, after which he was assigned to the cruiser .

From 1922–1923, he attended pilot training at Yokosuka and was assigned to a naval fighter squadron based at Kasumigaura.  From 1924–1925, he was assigned to the seaplane carrier .  Serving a number of staff assignments at the Yokosuka Naval District and Naval Air Command from 1925–1932, he was promoted to lieutenant commander in 1926 and to commander in 1931. In 1933, he was sent as a naval attaché to the United States and Europe. On his return, he became the executive officer on the aircraft carrier .  Promoted to captain in 1936, he was subsequently assigned command of a number of fighter squadrons until given command of Ryūjō in 1939.

On 25 March 1941, he took command of the aircraft carrier , which became flagship for Admiral Chuichi Nagumo during the attack on Pearl Harbor. While on Akagi, Hasegawa participated in the invasion of Rabaul in January 1942, the air strikes against Darwin, Australia in February, the invasion of Java in the Dutch East Indies in March, and the Indian Ocean raid in April. Just prior to the sortie of Akagi and Kido Butai for the Battle of Midway, he yielded his command to Captain Taijiro Aoki.  Hasegawa was promoted to rear admiral on 1 November 1942.

After participating in many carrier battles in the Pacific War Hasegawa was killed in action on 29 March 1944. He was posthumously promoted to the rank of vice admiral.

References

Books

External links

Notes

1894 births
1944 deaths
Military personnel from Saitama Prefecture
Japanese admirals of World War II
Japanese naval aviators
Japanese military personnel killed in World War II